is a recurring character in The Legend of Zelda series. First appearing in The Legend of Zelda: Majora's Mask, he has since appeared in several installments. He has gone on to be the star of Freshly-Picked Tingle's Rosy Rupeeland, and its sequel Irozuki Tingle no Koi no Balloon Trip, as well as the minigame collections Tingle's Balloon Fight DS and Dekisugi Tingle Pack.

Concept and creation
Tingle was created by Takaya Imamura, a game designer at Nintendo EAD. According to an interview with Kensuke Tanabe, producer of Freshly-Picked Tingle's Rosy Rupeeland, character designer Imamura created Tingle in a "very relaxed manner".

The Legend of Zelda producer Eiji Aonuma explained Tingle's origins in an interview with Kotaku. He stated that the character had been designed as a way for the player to access maps in Majora's Mask. He commented that "we ultimately ended up with a character here that had a little bit of humor to him that [came from] thinking of...'What sort of person would sell a map?' And, well, we decided it would be the kind of person who makes a map. And the way that he makes a map is by floating through the air so that he can see the contours of the land and draw them". He further explained that this thought process had resulted in the character being designed as, "a really weird guy".

In an interview with Electronic Gaming Monthly, director Eiji Aonuma said that he had "found out some American people didn't like him very much" and ultimately decided not to include him in The Legend of Zelda: Twilight Princess as a result. In a later interview with Nintendo Dream, he stated that the character Purlo is his reference to Tingle in Twilight Princess. According to Aonuma, Purlo's appearance "is the result of wondering what a realistic Tingle would look like".

Eiji Aonuma revealed that Tingle's characteristics are reminiscent of the character Peter Pan: "You know, if you think about it, it's this guy in his 30s in a green suit and is flying and never wants to grow up, it all sort of comes together around that". When asked if the character is gay, Aonuma commented, "He's not gay. He's just an odd person".

Characteristics
Tingle, in his Wind Waker form is a short, pudgy 35-year-old, while Tingle, in his Majora's Mask form, is an averaged-sized, paunchy 35-year-old  man who is obsessed with "forest fairies" and dresses up in a green costume, slightly resembling that of Link. He also wears tight red shorts and a necklace with a clock that is permanently stuck at four o'clock. 

In most of his appearances, Tingle sells maps. In Majora’s Mask, he is normally seen floating around on his red balloon drawing and selling maps for his father, who runs the Southern Swamp pictograph contest and sees Tingle as "a fool". In Oracle of Ages Tingle also sells a map from his ballon, while in The Wind Waker, he also translates Triforce Maps. Furthermore, he appears to have a fixation for Rupees and other similar collectibles, such as Force Gems in Four Swords Adventures and Kinstones in The Minish Cap. Tingle's fixation for Rupees is explained in the Nintendo DS game Freshly-Picked Tingle's Rosy Rupeeland, where it is stated that he needs Rupees to live. He is known to dress as a fairy. He is also known for his catchphrase: "Tingle, Tingle! Kooloo-Limpah!" .

Appearances

The Legend of Zelda series
Tingle made his debut in the Nintendo 64 game Majora's Mask. Throughout Link's adventure, Tingle helps Link navigate Termina by selling him maps of various areas. His father operates the pictograph contest at the Woodfall Swamp, and is ashamed by his son's antics.

He reappears in Oracle of Ages, giving Link a chart that he needs to cross the sea. He also gives Link upgrades to the Seed Satchel.

Tingle's first appearance in The Wind Waker is in a prison cell on Windfall Island. When freed, Tingle gives Link the Tingle Tuner, a device that can be used if the player connects a Game Boy Advance to the GameCube via the Nintendo GameCube Game Boy Advance Cable. This allows a second player to control Tingle and assist Link. However, in the Wii U remake, Tingle gives Link the Tingle Bottle, which can be used to post on Miiverse, instead of the Tingle Tuner. Tingle also gives the player a map to Tingle Island, and can be found for the rest of the game on this island, near the top of Tingle Tower. According to the Tingle Tuner, Tingle is merely a native of a different island with a Tingle-centric legend, that he tries to emulate. He deciphers the charts needed to haul the Triforce Shards from the ocean floor. This game also introduced his brothers, Ankle and Knuckle, who are twins, and David Jr., who is not related but was saved by Tingle after his ship was sucked into a cyclone.

He appears in the GameCube game Four Swords Adventures. If a player leaves a good deal of Force Gems lying around for too long, Tingle will eventually float towards them on his balloon to steal them. There is also a trap in this game that causes Tingle to lead an army of lookalikes and steal the gems directly from the Links.

Tingle, Ankle, Knuckle, and David Jr. are able to fuse Kinstones with Link in the Game Boy Advance game The Minish Cap. When all four have fused Kinstones with Link, a passage will open on the Castle Grounds that gives him the Magic Boomerang. Once Link has done every Kinstone fusion, Tingle will award Link with the Tingle statue.

In Phantom Hourglass, Tingle makes a small appearance in Mercay Island's bar, as a poster on the wall. In Spirit Tracks, a small Tingle figurine is in Hyrule Castle Town's shop and Linebeck III's shop. In Skyward Sword, a Tingle doll can be seen in Zelda's room at the Knight Academy. Tingle appears as an additional playable character in Hyrule Warriors via the Majora's Mask DLC pack. In Breath of the Wild the main character Link is able to discover and wear a Tingle outfit made available via a DLC pack.

Tingle series

Freshly-Picked Tingle's Rosy Rupeeland and Irozuki Tingle no Koi no Balloon Trip
Tingle's first starring role was in the spin-off title game known as Freshly-Picked Tingle's Rosy Rupeeland for the Nintendo DS. It tells the story of Tingle as a simple, 35-year-old man who ended up becoming a Tingle after meeting a character known as Uncle Rupee, who encourages him to obtain wealth by any means necessary. In its sequel Irozuki Tingle no Koi no Balloon Trip, a regular man is sucked into a magical book and turned into Tingle, and has to establish relationships with women in order to escape.

Tingle's Balloon Fight DS and Dekisugi Tingle  Pack
Tingle's Balloon Fight DS is a rebranded and updated version of Balloon Fight, while Dekisugi Tingle  Pack (lit. "Too Much Tingle Pack") is a DSiWare application that includes several different minigames, including a fortune-teller, calculator, timer, coin-flipper and dancing game.

Other appearances
Tingle appears in Super Smash Bros. Melee as part of the Termina Bay stage, as well as an Assist Trophy in Super Smash Bros. Brawl and Super Smash Bros. for Nintendo 3DS and Wii U. In those games, he threw out a large amount of items that could quickly be grabbed by all of the fighters. However, he would sometimes just float away, not doing anything. He also appears as a trophy in those games, the former based on Majora's Mask and the latter two based on The Wind Waker.

Tingle also appears in Super Mario Maker as one of the unlockable "Mystery Mushroom" outfits.

Impact and reception
Outside of Japan, Tingle received an overwhelmingly negative reception. The editors at IGN did not like Tingle, in part because his role in The Wind Waker was an integral part of "tedious fetch quests". They titled the article "IGNcube's 2004 "Die, Tingle, Die! Die!" Campaign". When development for Twilight Princess began, IGN hoped that game directors Shigeru Miyamoto and Eiji Aonuma would not include the character, saying "we're not going to stand for him in another Zelda game". Tingle ranked sixth on GameDaily's top 10 ugliest game characters list, stating that his face looks out of place. GamesRadar described him as "Zelda's Jar Jar". Nintendo Power listed Tingle as one of the three weirdos, describing him as both a great cartographer as well as a "fully grown man in a green elf costume who rides a balloon and says, 'Tingle! Tingle! Kooloo-Limpah!'". Fan distaste for Tingle led to his exclusion from Twilight Princess. PALGN editor Matt Keller stated that Tingle was widely considered the weakest part of The Legend of Zelda: The Wind Waker. IGN, among others, ranked him number 1 of the top 20 weirdest Zelda characters.

However, many fans have stood up for Tingle, as well his respective game series. Criticism of the character primarily comes from Western gamers, but in Japan, Tingle has garnered a cult following, which resulted in the development of several spin-off games featuring Tingle as their star. In a 2013 interview with VentureBeat, Kensuke Tanabe had expressed interest in making another Tingle game: "I know that people cannot stand Tingle. But to me that challenge is: Could I take this character that is so reviled in the West and just [do] a complete turnaround and make him a beloved, fun character? The idea of that really just gets me going. I know we have made a Tingle game in the past, but maybe at some point down the road". He later joked that "it's like romance: You meet someone and you're like, 'Oh god, I can't stand that person'. And then three weeks later, you're madly in love – it's that turn, that quick whip, that motivates [me] a little bit".

Notes

References

Fictional salespeople
Male characters in video games
Nintendo protagonists
Non-human characters in video games
The Legend of Zelda characters
Video game characters introduced in 2000

it:Personaggi di Majora's Mask#Tingle
sv:Lista över rollfigurer i The Legend of Zelda-serien#Tingle